"You've Still Got a Place in My Heart" is a song written and originally recorded by American country music artist Leon Payne in 1950.

In 1967, Dean Martin released a version of the song on the album Happiness Is Dean Martin. Martin released the song as a single in 1968, which spent 7 weeks on the Billboard Hot 100 chart, peaking at No. 60, while reaching No. 7 on Billboards Easy Listening chart, and No. 44 on Canada's RPM 100.

In 1967, Glen Campbell released a version of the song as the B-side to By the Time I Get To Phoenix and on the album Burning Bridges.

It was covered by Con Hunley in 1978, whose version peaked at number 14 on the Billboard Hot Country Singles chart. 

George Jones covered it on his 1984 album, You've Still Got a Place in My Heart and released it as a single, peaking at number 3 on the Billboard Hot Country Singles chart.

Chart performance

Dean Martin

Con Hunley

George Jones

References 

1950 songs
1968 singles
1978 singles
1984 singles
Songs written by Leon Payne
Leon Payne songs
Dean Martin songs
Glen Campbell songs
Con Hunley songs
George Jones songs
Song recordings produced by Billy Sherrill
Song recordings produced by Jimmy Bowen
Warner Records singles
Epic Records singles